Kevin Zhu earned his Ph.D. degree from Stanford University and is currently a full professor at the Rady School of Management, University of California, San Diego (UCSD). His expertise is in IT for business, data analytics, e-commerce, software, digital transformation, as well as related executive training and business advisory.

He does research, consulting, and executive training in technology-enabled business innovations, technology adoption, IT planning, blockchain, digital healthcare, and crowd sourcing, as well as how these new technologies will transform traditional businesses.

Career
His research has been published in the top academic journals such as Management Science, Information Systems Research, IEEE, Marketing Science, and MIS Quarterly, as well as in a book Global E-Commerce (Cambridge University Press). He held editorial positions at the top academic journals and chaired major academic conferences. He has been invited to give research seminars by more than 60 top institutions around the world, and has made more than 100 presentations in academic conferences and industry workshops.

Achievements and honours
Kevin Zhu is widely recognized in the world by 5 Best Paper Awards, the Distinguished Fellow Award in the field, and the U.S. National Science Foundation's CAREER Award. Among the 3000 scholars in his profession, he was ranked the top 17th in the world as measured by research productivity (CAIS 2006) and top 10th per more recent research impact and citations. His work has been cited more than 10000 times per Google Scholar (with h-index of 28). Click here for a summary of his scholarly contributions.

References

External links

Living people
Year of birth missing (living people)
Place of birth missing (living people)
University of California, San Diego faculty
Stanford University alumni